An advisory referendum on joining the European Union was held in Finland on 16 October 1994. 56.9% of voters approved of the proposal, with a voter turnout of 70.8%. Due to having its own customs jurisdiction, a separate referendum was held in Åland a month later, and was also approved.

Party policies

Results

By province

 A separate referendum was also held in the Åland Islands as it was a separate customs jurisdiction.

References

External links
 Doria.fi – Finland's EU referendum 1994 by Statistics Finland (PDF) 

Finland
1994 in Finland
1994
Referendums related to European Union accession
October 1994 events in Europe